Grazia India is the Indian edition of the Italian women's fashion and celebrity gossip magazine Grazia. It is the 10th international edition of Grazia. The monthly magazine covers fashion, health, and current events, and is targeted at affluent urban women.

History and profile
The first issue of the Indian edition of Grazia was the April 2008 issue featuring Bipasha Basu on the cover. It was launched on 7 April 2008 by Worldwide Media (WWM). Grazia, owned by  Arnoldo Mondadori Editore, is published under license in India by World Wide Media. Started in 2004, WWM was originally a joint venture between The Times Group and BBC Worldwide. It has been a wholly owned subsidiary of The Times Group since October 2011. The company also publishes Femina, Filmfare, Top Gear, GoodHomes Magazine, Lonely Planet magazine and Hello India, among others.

Nandini Bhalla is one of the former editors-in-chief of the magazine.

References

External links
Grazia India official site

2008 establishments in Maharashtra
English-language magazines published in India
Monthly magazines published in India
Women's magazines published in India
Magazines established in 2008
Women's fashion magazines